Akaishi (written: 赤石 lit "red stone") may refer to:

Akaishi Mountains, mountain range in Honshū, Japan
Mount Akaishi
Akaishi (surname)